Karnataka Konkani Sahitya Academy  is formed in the Indian state of Karnataka to promote Konkani language and literature. This organisation is funded every year through the Budget of Karnataka Government.

This organisation conducts several events including Konkani Lokotsav, once every year.

See also
 Konkani language agitation

References

Konkani languages
Organisations based in Karnataka
Year of establishment missing
Language regulators